Churma wahi wala is a popular Haryanvi, Rajasthani, Bihari, Uttar Pradesi, and Awadhi delicacy from India. In Punjab, the dish is called churi. It is coarsely ground wheat crushed and cooked with ghee and sugar. 

In Haryana, churma is made by mashing up roti in ghee and jaggery. It is not served with ghee, especially as a diet for the wrestlers sparring in the danggal of akharas. It is usually served either with a tall glass of warm milk, lassi, or with sour kadhi.

In Rajasthan, churma is made in lots of variations. It is made by either mashing up roti made of either bajra (see pearl millet) or 'gehu' (see wheat) with Desi ghee and sugar ( shakkar / khand / bura / kasar ) or jaggery pieces. It is commonly eaten with kadhi, dahl / daal, topped with ghee. 'Dade ka Churma' or is often called 'Rajasthani Churma' is a special kind of churma that is native to Rajasthan. It is made by sifting wheat flour, suji (see semolina ) and besan. Then kneading into a dough adding melted ghee and milk. Small 'lois' (dough balls) are made, and fried till golden brown. After the lois cool down, they are grinded to a coarse powdery texture. Following which, powdered sugar, cardamom and dry fruits are mixed in. It is a popular companion to the dish dal baati. and is eaten often at social events / celebration, served with dahl.

See also
 Dal bati churma

References

Indian desserts
Rajasthani cuisine
Rajasthani desserts